Sérézin-de-la-Tour (literally Sérézin of La Tour) is a commune in the Isère department in the region Auvergne-Rhône-Alpes southeastern France.

Its inhabitants are known as the Sérézinnois.

Geography
The Bourbre forms part of the commune's northern border.

Population

See also
Communes of the Isère department

References

Communes of Isère
Isère communes articles needing translation from French Wikipedia